HRW usually refers to Human Rights Watch, a human rights advocacy group.

HRW may also refer to:
 Harrow & Wealdstone station, in London
 Highest random weight hashing
 Holt, Rinehart, Winston, an American publisher; now part of Holt McDougal
 Hulk Hogan's Rock 'n' Wrestling, an American animated television series
 Human right to water
 Tangga language, spoken in Papua New Guinea